Belgium is set to participate in the Eurovision Song Contest 2023 in Liverpool, United Kingdom, with "Because of You" performed by Gustaph. The Flemish broadcaster of Belgium, Vlaamse Radio- en Televisieomroeporganisatie (VRT), organised the national final Eurosong 2023 in order to select the Belgian entry for the 2023 contest.

Background 

In 2022, Jérémie Makiese represented the nation with the song "Miss You", qualifying for the final and placing 19th.

The Belgian broadcaster for the 2023 contest, who broadcasts the event in Belgium and organises the selection process for its entry, is Vlaamse Radio- en Televisieomroeporganisatie (VRT). The Belgian participation in the contest alternates between two broadcasters: the Flemish VRT and the Walloon Radio Télévision Belge de la Communauté Française (RTBF). Both broadcasters have selected the Belgian entry using national finals and internal selections in the past.

Before Eurovision

Eurosong 2023 
Eurosong 2023 was the national final that selected Belgium's entry in the Eurovision Song Contest 2023. The competition will consist of five pre-recorded songclub shows that was broadcast between 9 and 13 January 2023, followed by a live final on 14 January 2023 where the winning song and artist was selected. All six shows was hosted by Peter Van de Veire and broadcast on Eén, as well as on the broadcaster's online streaming platform VRT MAX.

Format 
Seven artists were sought to compete in Eurosong. The competition included five songclub shows that was broadcast between 9 and 13 January 2023. The shows will feature each artist presenting their two candidate Eurovision songs in front of the six other artists who will provide commentary and feedback on the songs. Based on the feedback, the artist selected one of the two songs to proceed to the final. The result of the final was made up of votes from an expert jury and public televoting, conducted via SMS and the VRT MAX app. Each member of the jury voted by assigning scores from 4–8, 10 and 12 points to their preferred songs, with the juries awarding 780 points in total. The public vote was based on the percentage of votes each song achieved through SMS and app voting. For example, if a song gained 10% of the viewer vote in the final, then that entry would be awarded 10% of 780 points rounded to the nearest integer: 78 points.

The jury panel consisted of:

 Alexander Rybak – Norwegian singer, winner of the 
 Nikkie de Jager – Dutch makeup artist and YouTuber, co-host of the 
 Laura Tesoro – singer and actress, represented Belgium in 2016
 Jérémie Makiese – singer, represented Belgium in 2022
 Laura Govaerts – presenter at MNM
 Ann Reymen – presenter at Radio 2
 Korneel de Clercq – presenter at Radio 1
 Thibault Christiaensen – presenter at Studio Brussel
 Francicso Schuster – actor, singer and dancer
 Leslie Cable – Eurovision Head of Delegation for Wallonian broadcaster RTBF
 Jasper van Biesen – author of 65 Years of Belgium at the Eurovision Song Contest
 Stephan Monsieur – chairman of OGAE Belgium
 André Vermeulen – journalist and Eurovision specialist
 Els Germonpré – music coordinator for Eén
 Manu Lammens – music manager of MNM

Competing entries 
The names of the seven acts selected for the competition were announced on 8 November 2022 during the radio MNM programme . Among the competing artists is former Eurovision Song Contest participant Tom Dice (member of the Starlings), who represented Belgium in 2010. The artists were selected by an A&R Team (Arts and Repertoire) consisting of music experts from VRT in consultation with record labels and artist managers. Artists that were previously rumoured to be selected included Niels Destadsbader and Belgian Eurovision Song Contest 2016 participant Laura Tesoro. The candidate Eurovision songs to be performed by the artists were announced on 15 December 2022, along with twenty-second snippets of each entry.

Songclub shows 
The songclub shows were recorded in Tournai and aired between 9 and 13 January 2023 at 19:45 . In the shows, each artist performed their two candidate songs and selected one of them to advance to the final, taking into account the advice of the other contestants. Every act followed the advice of the fellow contestants with the exception of The Starlings, who had been advised to select "Oceanside" by the other participants.

Final 
The final took place on 14 January 2023 at the Palais 12 in Brussels. The combination of results from an expert jury and a public televote selected the winner. During the final, commentary and feedback to the entries was provided by four members of the expert jury, namely Alexander Rybak, Nikkie de Jager, Laura Tesoro and Jérémie Makiese, who decided the outcome of the final together with eleven other jury members, who were appointed to vote offstage. In addition to the competing entries, the participants performed covers of Eurovision songs: "Euphoria" performed by Ameerah, "Rhythm Inside" performed by Gala Dragot, "Waterloo" performed by Gustaph, "Rise Like a Phoenix" performed by Loredana, "Heroes" performed by Hunter Falls, "Voilà" performed by Chérine and "Snap" performed by the Starlings, as well as performances from Duncan Laurence and Alexander Rybak.

Ratings

At Eurovision 
According to Eurovision rules, all nations with the exceptions of the host country and the "Big Five" (France, Germany, Italy, Spain and the United Kingdom) are required to qualify from one of two semi-finals in order to compete for the final; the top ten countries from each semi-final progress to the final. The European Broadcasting Union (EBU) split up the competing countries into six different pots based on voting patterns from previous contests, with countries with favourable voting histories put into the same pot. On 31 January 2023, an allocation draw was held, which placed each country into one of the two semi-finals, and determined which half of the show they would perform in. Belgium has been placed into the second semi-final, to be held on 11 May 2023, and has been scheduled to perform in the first half of the show.

References 

Countries in the Eurovision Song Contest 2023
Belgium